The 1978 Australasian Individual Speedway Championship was the third annual Australasian Final for Motorcycle speedway riders from Australia and New Zealand as part of the qualification for the 1978 Speedway World Championship.

The Final took place at the  Western Springs Stadium in Auckland and was won by 18-year-old sensation Mitch Shirra. Mick Mckeon finished second with John Titman and Mike Farrell the final qualifiers for the 1978 Intercontinental Final to be held at the Fredericia Speedway Center in Fredericia, Denmark.

1977 World Champion Ivan Mauger was not required to ride in Auckland as he had been seeded directly into the Intercontinental Final.

Australasian Final
 February 18
  Auckland, New Zealand - Western Springs Stadium
 Qualification: First 4 to the Intercontinental Final in Fredericia, Denmark
 Reigning World Champion Ivan Mauger seeded directly to the Intercontinental Final.

References

See also
 Sport in New Zealand
 Motorcycle Speedway

Speedway competitions in New Zealand
1978 in speedway
Individual Speedway Championship
1978 in New Zealand motorsport